Ornithodoros turicata, commonly referred to as the relapsing fever tick, is a soft tick found in the midwestern and southwestern United States. It is a known vector of Borrelia turicatae, a spirochete responsible for tick-borne relapsing fever in humans. Additionally, vector competence for the transmission of Leptospira pomona, the agent of canine jaundice, has been demonstrated in a laboratory setting.

See also
 APHC Entomological Sciences Tick Species Page - Ornithodoros turicata

References

Ticks
Arachnids of North America
Animals described in 1876
Argasidae